The University of Toronto successfully defended its inaugural Grey Cup championship with a victory over the Hamilton Tigers.

Canadian football news in 1910
The Regina Rugby Club was formed on September 13 at the Regina City Hall and adopted the colours of old gold and purple. Regina played the Moose Jaw Tigers in its first game on October 1 at the Moose Jaw Baseball Grounds, with the Tigers winning 16–6.

On September 22, the Saskatchewan Rugby Football Union was organized in the Flanagan Hotel at Saskatoon. The SRFU adopted the CRU rules.

Edmonton changed its name from Esquimaux to the Eskimos.

Source:

Regular season

Final regular season standings
Note: GP = Games Played, W = Wins, L = Losses, T = Ties, PF = Points For, PA = Points Against, Pts = Points
*Bold text means that they have clinched the playoffs

League Champions

Grey Cup playoffs
Note: All dates in 1910

Alberta Rugby Football League playoffs

Calgary wins the total-point series 39-19.

East semi-final

Toronto Varsity Blues advance to the Grey Cup.

Playoff bracket

Grey Cup Championship

References

 
Canadian Football League seasons